Medical Ethics; or, a Code of Institutes and Precepts, Adapted to the Professional Conduct of Physicians and Surgeons is a medical book focused on public health and medical ethics. It was written by English physician Thomas Percival and published in 1803. The book is widely regarded as the first on public health and ethics in medicine. Prior to 1803 medical ethics was more focused on medical etiquette. Medical Ethics was the first book to coin the term "medical ethics". The book "adopts a holistic approach to patient care" and set the standard for many future textbooks.

References

External links
 Medical Ethics; or ... - scan of the 1803 edition on Internet Archive

1803 non-fiction books
Ethics books
Medical manuals
Medical ethics